Alice Olivia Walker better known by her ring name Alex Windsor is an English professional wrestler currently working as a freelancer and is best known for her time in Revolution Pro Wrestling, Pro-Wrestling: EVE and for her work in various promotions from the European independent scene.

Professional wrestling career

British independent scene (2010–present)

Pro-Wrestling: EVE (2010–present)
Walker's longest tenure with any company is with Pro-Wrestling: EVE, promotion in which she has fought since 2010. She made her debut at EVE/WAW Potentials, a joint event co-promoted alongside World Association Of Wrestling on 14 November 2010, where she fell short to Queen Maya. During her years in it, she challenged for various championships. At EVE Wrestle Queendom 4 on 27 August 2021, Walker participated in a 30-woman battle royal for the Pro-Wrestling: EVE Championship won by Jetta and also involving notable opponents such as Zoe Lucas, Erin Angel and Rhea O'Reilly. At EVE Slayers In Spandex 2 on 5 February 2022, she unsuccessfully faced Laura DiMatteo for the vacant Pro-Wrestling: EVE International Championship. At EVE God Save The Wrestle Queens on 3 June 2022, she teamed up with Charlie Morgan and unsuccessfully challenged The Uprising (Rhia O'Reilly and Skye Smitson) for the Pro-Wrestling: EVE Tag Team Championship. Walker succeeded in winning the EVE Championship at the afternoon show of the Wrestle Queendom 5 on 13 November 2022 by defeating Jetta. However she dropped the title at the evening show to Miyu Yamashita.

Progress Wrestling (2016–present)
Walker made her first appearance in Progress Wrestling at PROGRESS Chapter 36 on 25 September 2016, where she teamed up with Dahlia Black and Jinny to defeat Laura Di Matteo, Nixon Newell and Pollyanna as a result of a Six-woman tag team match. She continued to make sporadic appearances and eventually challenged Toni Storm for the Progress Wrestling World Women's Championship at PROGRESS Chapter 58 on 26 November 2017, but unsuccessfully.

Revolution Pro Wrestling (2021–present)
Walker made her debut in Revolution Pro Wrestling on 10 October 2021, at RevPro Live In Southampton 14 where she defeated Gisele Shaw in a singles match. One month later at RevPro Live At The NOTpit 55 on 7 November 2021, she successfully challenged Shaw for the Undisputed British Women's Championship at her second appearance for the company. Walker marked several notable successful defenses of the title, one of them being against Kylie Rae at RevPro Epic Encounter 2022 on 22 May.

Japanese independent scene (2022–present)
Walker began competing in the Japanese independent scene in July 2022. At her very first appearance, which took place on 9 July at TJPW Summer Sun Princess '22, an event promoted by Tokyo Joshi Pro Wrestling, she defeated Maki Itoh to win the International Princess Championship. Walker would drop the title to Miu Watanabe three months later on 9 October 2022, at Wrestle Princess III. On the first night of Royal Quest II, an event promoted by New Japan Pro Wrestling on 1 October she teamed up with Ava White to defeat Jazzy Gabert and Kanji.

Personal life
Walker was married to fellow professional wrestler Ryan Smile until his death in October 2020.

Championships and accomplishments
Bellatrix Female Warriors
Bellatrix World Championship (2 times)
Bellatrix European Championship (1 time)
Bellatrix British Championship (1 time)
Pro Wrestling Illustrated
Ranked No. 24 of the top 150 female singles wrestlers in the PWI Women's 150 in 2022
Pro-Wrestling: EVE
Pro-Wrestling: EVE Championship (1 time)
SHE-1 (2022)
Revolution Pro Wrestling
Undisputed British Women's Championship (1 time, current)
Tokyo Joshi Pro Wrestling
International Princess Championship (1 time)
Wrestle Carnival
Queen Of The Carnival Championship (1 time, current)

References

1993 births
Living people
English female professional wrestlers
21st-century professional wrestlers
Sportspeople from Norfolk
Undisputed British Women's Champions